Rolland Roche (born 12 December 1952) is a retired French alpine skier who competed in the 1976 Winter Olympics, where he finished 15th in the Men's slalom.

External links
 sports-reference.com
 

1952 births
Living people
French male alpine skiers
Olympic alpine skiers of France
Alpine skiers at the 1976 Winter Olympics
Place of birth missing (living people)
20th-century French people